São Tomé and Príncipe–Taiwan relations are relations between São Tomé and Príncipe and the Republic of China (ROC). Official bilateral relations began in 1997 and ended in 2016.

History
São Tomé and Príncipe declared independence from Portugal on 12 July 1975 and recognized the People's Republic of China (PRC) on the same day.

Bilateral relations between São Tomé and Príncipe and the Republic of China were first established on 6 May 1997. In accordance with the One-China policy, the PRC suspended relations with São Tomé and Príncipe on 11 July 1997. In February 1998, ROC Foreign Minister Jason Hu made an official visit to São Tomé and Príncipe. São Tomé and Príncipe President Miguel Trovoada visited Taiwan in June of that year. São Tomé granted Taiwan landing visa privileges in 2012. In 2013, the PRC established a trade office in São Tomé, and the next year President Manuel Pinto da Costa visited China in a private capacity. Bilateral relations between São Tomé and Príncipe and the Republic of China were terminated on 21 December 2016 by Taiwan due to exorbitant amounts of financial aid being requested.

Aid
ROC aid to São Tomé and Príncipe focused on agriculture, energy, and technology. Another area of cooperation was public health. Many Taiwanese medical professionals have lent their expertise in an effort to stop the spread of malaria in São Tomé. Taipei Medical University began offering medical aid to São Tomé in 2009, and ended the program upon the cessation of official ties in 2016. Prior to the end of bilateral relations São Tomé was a member of the Taiwan Scholarship program.

References

 
Taiwan
Sao Tome and Principe